Palpaldo is a village situated at the right bank of the indus river in Kharmang valley of Baltistan, Pakistan.

See also 

 Gilgit-Baltistan
 Kharmang District

References 

Populated places in Kharmang District
Populated places in Gilgit-Baltistan